Rapala diopites is a species of butterfly of the family Lycaenidae. It is found on the Philippines.

Subspecies
Rapala diopites diopites
Rapala diopites alcetas (Staudinger, 1889) (Philippines: Palawan, Luzon)
Rapala diopites alcetina (Semper, 1890) (Philippines: Mindanao)

References

Butterflies described in 1869
Rapala (butterfly)
Butterflies of Asia
Taxa named by William Chapman Hewitson